Lüübnitsa Umbjärv is a lake in Estonia.

See also
List of lakes of Estonia

Lakes of Estonia
Setomaa Parish
Lakes of Võru County